Jhamra is a village at the Faisalabad District in Punjab, Pakistan. It is known for being birthplace of Rai Ahmad Khan Kharal, a famous 
Punjabi Muslim freedom fighter of War of Independence (1857),  who was known as Nawab of Jhamra. He died fighting against British East India Company on 23 September 1857 and is buried in Jhamra.

References

Populated places in Faisalabad District